Lukas Spalvis (born 27 July 1994) is a retired Lithuanian professional footballer who last played as forward for 1. FC Kaiserslautern.

Early years
Lukas Spalvis was born in Lithuania. When he was six, he emigrated with his mother from Lithuania and settled in Switzerland in Basel. While living in Basel, he went to a German school.

Club career

Youth
Spalvis joined in 2010 the SV Weil 1910 from Weil am Rhein, the German neighboring town of Basel. In 2011, he joined the youth academy of SC Freiburg.

AaB
Spalvis joined the club as a youth player in 2012 and was promoted to the first team squad in the summer of 2013. He got his first match for AaB when he was in the line up in the DBU Pokalen game against Silkeborg IF on 29 August 2013. His first Danish Superliga appearance happened on 6 October 2013 when he was subbed in during the 74th minute against Viborg FF.

While playing for AaB, Spalvis earned the nickname "Zweimal" meaning "twice" in German. He earned this nickname because he, for every match in which he scored a goal, always scored a second goal in the game as well. This streak held for 5 matches, until scoring just one goal against OB on 24 August 2015.

In the first half of the 2015–16 Danish Superliga Season, he had impressively scored 14 goals in 17 league matches, leading to transfer rumors about Spalvis moving to Galatasaray and Sporting Clube de Portugal.

Sporting CP
On 8 February 2016, it was confirmed, that Spalvis will move to Sporting Clube de Portugal from 1 July 2016. He would therefore play in AaB to the end of the 2015–16 Danish Superliga-season.

Due to his many injuries, Spalvis didn't play any games for Sporting in the first half season, and the club loaned out the forward to Belenenses on 1 January 2017. But only 16 days later, they called Spalvis back from Belenenses and canceled the contract, because 'he wasn't fit enough' and 'they wasn't ready to take that risk'.

On 2 February 2017, Sporting announced that Spalvis would play the remainder of the year on loan for Norwegian club Rosenborg BK. Rosenborg said that Spalvis would transfer to them on loan if he passed his medical. Spalvis had suffered from a severe knee injury since his arrival at Sporting. On 14 February, Spalvis failed his medical and Rosenborg said that Spalvis was not ready for the club pending that Sporting would pay the players fees during his rehabilitation with them. On 27 February, Rosenborg announced that the transfer would not be completed as Rosenborg and Sporting could not come to a deal that satisfied the Norwegian club.

1. FC Kaiserslautern
Spalvis was loaned out again on 5 July 2017, joining 2. Bundesliga side 1. FC Kaiserslautern for the 2017–18 season. On 8 May 2018, it was announced that he had joined 1. FC Kaiserslautern on a permanent deal.

On 25 August 2018, in a league match against Karlsruher SC, he sustained a cartilage injury to his knee. The injury was estimated to keep him out of action for a "long" time. After two years without team training he returned in April 2021.

He agreed the termination of his contract in October 2021.

International career
Spalvis played several matches for youth national teams, including Lithuania U-19 and Lithuania U-21. In March 2014 he made his debut for the senior team, in a friendly match against Kazakhstan.

Career statistics

Club

International

Scores and results list Lithuania's goal tally first, score column indicates score after each Spalvis goal.

Honours

Club
AaB
Danish Superliga: 2013–14
Danish Cup: 2013–14

Individual
Lithuanian Footballer of the Year: 2015
Best player in the fall 2015, Superliga. 
Player of the Month, Superliga (2): April 2014 and October 2015.
UEFA Top Scorer

References

1994 births
Living people
Lithuanian footballers
Association football forwards
Lithuania international footballers
Lithuania under-21 international footballers
Lithuanian expatriate footballers
AaB Fodbold players
Sporting CP footballers
C.F. Os Belenenses players
1. FC Kaiserslautern players
Danish Superliga players
2. Bundesliga players
3. Liga players
Lithuanian expatriate sportspeople in Switzerland
Lithuanian expatriate sportspeople in Germany
Lithuanian expatriate sportspeople in Denmark
Lithuanian expatriate sportspeople in Portugal
Expatriate men's footballers in Denmark
Expatriate footballers in Portugal
Expatriate footballers in Germany